Hungry Hungry Hippos (or Hungry Hippos in some UK editions) is a tabletop game made for 2–4 players, produced by Hasbro, under the brand of its subsidiary, Milton Bradley. The idea for the game was published in 1967 by toy inventor Fred Kroll and it was introduced in 1978. The objective of the game is for each player to collect as many marbles as possible with their "hippo" (a toy hippopotamus model). The game is marketed under the "Elefun and Friends" banner, along with Elefun, Mouse Trap and Gator Golf.

Gameplay
The game board is surrounded by four mechanical, colorful, plastic hippopotamuses operated by levers on their backs.  When the lever is pressed, the hippo opens its mouth and extends its head forwards on a telescopic neck. When the lever is released, the head comes down and retracts. Plastic marbles are dispensed into the board by each player, and the players repeatedly press the lever on their hippo in order to have it "eat" the marbles, which travel down from under the hippo into a small scoring area for each player.  Once all marbles have been captured, the player who has collected the most is the winner.

Advertising
The original late-'70s and '80s television advertisements for the game featured a memorable jingle:

 If you wanna win the game you've gotta take good aim
 And get the most marbles with your hippo
 Playin' Hungry Hungry Hippos
 Hungry Hungry Hippos

The 1990s-era advertisements featured a series of brightly colored cartoon hippos dancing in a conga line and singing, "Hungry Hungry Hip-pos!" to the beat:

 "It's a race, it's a chase, hurry up and feed their face!
 Who will win?  No one knows!  Feed the hungry hip-ip-pos!
 Hungry hungry hippos! (open up and there it goes!)"

As of 2009, the song in the commercial is the "Elefun and Friends" theme song.

Characters

There were four hippopotamuses in the original version of the game: Lizzie Hippo (pink/purple), Henry Hippo (orange), Homer Hippo (green), and Harry Hippo (yellow). In some versions of Hungry Hungry Hippos, Henry is blue. In others, the purple hippo is Happy. The fall 2009 North American edition of the game has a lighter blue base with pastel-colored versions of the hippos: Sweetie Potamus (pink), Bottomless Potamus (yellow),  Veggie Potamus (green), and Picky Potamus (orange). The 2012 re-release has a slightly darker blue base and has the following hippos: Sweetie Potamus (blue), Bottomless Potamus (yellow), Veggie Potamus (green), and Hungry Hippo (orange).

Video games
In 1991, Innovative Concepts in Entertainment (ICE) created a redemption arcade version of the game, a supersized resemblance of the board game version. The amount of marbles consumed was displayed at the top of the dome for each player. The more marbles a hippo consumed, the more tickets that hippo's player received.

The previous year, Sinclair User published a game called "Piggy Punks", written by Hellenic Software for the ZX Spectrum, which was inspired by the board game. The game showed an overhead view of a board with four pigs, each controlled by a separate player, in place of the four hippos.

Film adaptation
In 2012, film studio Emmett/Furla Films announced that they were working on an animated film adaptation of Hungry Hungry Hippos, along with Monopoly and Action Man.
The movie's plot and other details were being kept secret. Production was originally scheduled to start in early 2016. This film was also released earlier as a horror film in 2007 by Randall Emmett George

In popular culture
The game has been referenced in The Simpsons (1992), Mystery Science Theater 3000, Donnie Darko (2001), Toy Story 3 (2010), My Little Pony: The Movie (2017), The Last Man on Earth (2017), Safe Havens (2018), Space Force (2020), and in The Afterparty (2022). There is also a battle level based on the game in the 2016 Micro Machines game.

Tournaments
Rogue Judges, a volunteer judging group at Gen Con ran a "1st Annual Hungry Hungry Hippos World Championship" in August of 2015 and have continued to hold one every year since at the Indiana Convention Center.

A Hungry Hungry Hippos Tournament was also hosted at Smash the Record 2017.

References

External links
 The Frantic Marble Munching Game!, a detailed set of game-playing instructions from Hasbro.
 
 Arcade version of Hungry Hungry Hippos

Board games introduced in 1978
Children's board games
Fictional hippopotamuses
Milton Bradley Company games